Luis Herrera Campins served as President of Venezuela from 1979 to 1984. Prior to his election, he founded the moderately conservative Christian COPEI party. He was succeeded by Jaime Lusinchi.

Background

In the Republic of Venezuela, presidents and congress were elected in the same election for five-year terms. At the 1978 election, AD fielded the unexciting Luis Piñerúa Ordaz and the COPEI selected Luis Herrera Campins. 

Some observers believed that Venezuelans were ready to elect a leader who opposed the lavish expenditures of predecessor Carlos Andrés Pérez. Herrera Campins ran on the slogan "¡Basta!" ("Enough!") in reference to the spending levels at the time. The adecos were in a no-win situation disillusioned as they were with Pérez and unexcited by Piñerua, and Herrera defeated his Adeco adversary by a vote of 1,133,059 to 1,053,137. Venezuela had demonstrated once again that at the ballot level it was a working democracy.

Presidency
At the start of Herrera Campins' term, Venezuela's economy was succeeding due to high oil revenues. However, it also faced extremely high foreign debt due to the effects of spending by the previous President, Carlos Andrés Pérez. During his campaign he pledged to reduce expenditures, but during his term he spent on extravagant projects such as the Teresa Carreño Theater and expensive public works such as the Caracas Metro. He promised to other Latin American countries to supply them with oil.  When oil prices fell in 1983, an economic depression began.

Few presidents had practiced winner-takes-all as Herrera Campins did. Even full-blooded Social Christians who had worked for the Pérez administration were fired. But Herrera did have in his cabinet a few figures that were not copeyanos, among them Manuel Quijada, the former anti-democracy conspirator. (Later, Quijada was one of the political advisors of Chavez before the former paratrooper won the presidency.) He named the economist Leopoldo Díaz Bruzual to the Venezuelan Central Bank. Díaz Bruzual was a protégé of and advisor to Reinaldo Cervini, a very rich man who had life-time tenure at Pro-Venezuela, a kind of semi-official institute founded to promote Venezuelan industrialization. Cervini doubled as Maecenas to communist intellectuals, who would physically confront anyone who dared criticize their patron. Herrera Campins toned down the showiness of his predecessor, even though his government had another windfall when oil prices rose dramatically again in 1983. Venezuela had increased its indebtedness beyond the levels attained by the Pérez government. There was much talk at the time of "bipolarity", the belief that Venezuela was stuck forever in the cycle of AD-COPEI ruling alternatively but following the same policies of high-spending, high-bureaucracy, and a statized economy. One brash foreign policy initiative taken by Herrera either should have gladdened or encouraged militarists in Venezuela. When the Argentine military dictator and "dirty war" veteran Leopoldo Galtieri had the Falklands invaded in 1982, Venezuela officially, though not materially, backed the Argentine move.

When dollars flooded Venezuela again, economists began talking of "overheating", although it wasn't clear whether they knew what they were talking about. It was pseudo-technical jargon, but Díaz Bruzual was among the adherents to this idea, if not actually the economist who got the "overheated" ball rolling. In the USA, president Jimmy Carter was fighting inflationary pressures and interests rates there, and in the industrialized nations generally, went up to unheard of levels. In Venezuela, a Canadian bank was offering interests as high as 21%. But because of the overheating thesis, Díaz Bruzual applied an old law whereby interest payments above 12% were considered usurious and illegal. Dollars started flowing out of Venezuela in the billions, and the central bank, which had always been zealous about national reserves, took fright at their growing depletion, but instead of counter-acting with incentives to reverse the outward flow, the bolivar was officially devalued by over 50% on its previous 4.30 to the dollar. The government, in brief, was not going to subsidize the bolivar at its previous rate. But the measure encouraged a further massive flight of dollars, and the government then clamped full currency control.

During his presidency the inauguration of Teatro Teresa Carreno and the Metro de Caracas took place, along with the presidential election of Jaime Lusinchi of Acción Democrática.

Herrera's cabinet (1979-1984)

See also 

 Viernes Negro

References

History of Venezuela
Campins, Luis Herrera